The Hanka Homestead now known as the Hanka Homestead Finnish Museum is a group of eight buildings on a  homestead. The homestead was added to the National Register of Historic Places in 1984.

History and significance 
The Hanka Homestead was occupied by members of the Hanka family, Finnish immigrants, from 1896 until 1966.  The farm was originally homesteaded at a time of mass immigration from Finland to the United States, as well as a migration from the mining locations in the Upper Peninsula to more rural locations.  The homestead is relatively intact and unaltered from its appearance in the 1920s.  It is significant because it represents an agricultural way of life in the late 19th century, and the transfer of a northern European Finnish folk-architectural tradition to the American frontier.

The farm has been restored to its appearance in the 1920s and is open to visitors.  The farm is staffed from Memorial Day through Labor Day  on Tuesdays, Thursdays, Saturdays and Sundays from noon to 4pm; at other times self-guided tours are available.

Description 
The buildings are constructed of hewn logs, built by members of the Hanka family. The buildings included a farmhouse, hay barn, and sauna, all from c. 1896, and well as a woodshed, outhouse, horse barn (c. 1914), root cellar (c. 1902), indrive—no longer remains (c. 1902), blacksmith shop, cattle barn (1910), and milkhouse. The farmhouse includes a later addition from before 1915.

References

External links 

 Hanka Homestead Finnish Museum - official site
 Photographs of the Hanka Farm
 Visitor's information from the Travel Michigan
 Article from Hunts' Guide to Michigan's UPPER PENINSULA
  Photos

Museums in Baraga County, Michigan
Farms on the National Register of Historic Places in Michigan
Open-air museums in Michigan
Michigan State Historic Sites
Finnish-American history
Finnish-American culture in Michigan
Keweenaw National Historical Park
Historic districts on the National Register of Historic Places in Michigan
National Register of Historic Places in Baraga County, Michigan